Eugene Bloch (10 June 1878 1944) was a French physicist and professor at the Ecole Normale Supérieure, and at the Faculty of Science of the University of Paris.

Early life and education 
Eugene Bloch was born on 10 June 1878 in Soultz-Haut-Rhin, France. His father, an industrialist in the textile industry, sold his Alsatian factory and settled in Paris to give his two sons Leon and Eugene a French education. Eugene studied from 1897 to 1900 at the Ecole Normale Supérieure, where he studied the physics of Jules Violle, Marcel Brillouin, and Henri Abraham, and at the Faculty of Sciences of the University of Paris, where he attended the courses of Gabriel Lippmann and Edmond Bouty and obtained degrees in physics and mathematical sciences in 1899.

After having obtained the highest score in the aggregation examination, he taught at the physics laboratory of the Ecole Normale Supérieure while preparing his Ph.D. in Physical Science on ionization in phosphorescence which he defended at the Faculty of Sciences of the University of Paris in 1904.

Career and works 
In 1906 Eugene Bloch became professor of physics in the special mathematics class at the Saint-Louis secondary school in Paris, where he taught for eleven years. In addition to his teaching, Eugene Bloch also carried out research in the physics laboratory of the Ecole Normale Supérieure on the photoelectric effect and spectroscopy.

In 1908 Bloch completed the studies that he had pursued following his thesis and devoted himself to studying the photoelectric effect (discovered by Hertz in 1887 and then studied by Lenard around 1902). Unlike Lenard, Bloch understood the importance of distinguishing various colors, or wavelengths of light, instead of using white light. His experiments helped to support the interpretation given by Einstein in 1905.

In 1925 he developed the first spectrograph with a concave, reflective, and vacuum network which worked in the far ultra-violet up to wavelengths of up to 20 nm. The tables of wavelengths established with this apparatus on 30 chemical elements, and their variously charged ions, are still in use.

In 1940 Eugene Bloch was dismissed from his professorship following the anti-Jewish laws of the Vichy government and had to leave the Ecole Normale Superieure. He was succeeded by Georges Bruhat. Bloch passed clandestinely to the "free zone", and worked in a laboratory of the University of Lyon. This was formalized in 1941 as an official assignment of the newly formed French National Centre for Scientific Research. When the German army invaded the Free Zone in 1942, Eugene Bloch attempted unsuccessfully to flee to Switzerland. He then hid under a false identity in the mountains of Savoy. The Gestapo found and arrested him at Allevard on 24 January 1944. He was deported from Bobigny station by Convoy no. 69 of 7 March 1944 and was murdered at the Auschwitz concentration camp.

Publications 
 Théorie cinétique des gaz, éditeur Armand Colin 1921.
 Phénomènes Thermoioniques, éditions du Journal de Physique 1921.
 Enregistrement des signaux de TSF , 1921.
 L'ancienne et la nouvelle théorie des quanta, éditions Hermann, 1930.

See also 
 Three Physicists Prize
 Henri-Alexandre Danlos

References 

 Serge Klarsfeld. Le Mémorial de la Déportation des Juifs de France. Beate et Serge Klarsfeld: Paris, 1978.
 Freddy Raphaël et Robert Weyl, "Eugène Bloch," in Nouveau dictionnaire de biographie alsacienne, vol. 4, p. 256
 Paul Langevin, Remarques à propos de la communication de M. Eugène Bloch, 1905.
 Les Trois Physiciens Henri Abraham, Eugène Bloch, Georges Bruhat, éditions rue d'Ulm, 2009.

People from Soultz-Haut-Rhin
1878 births
1944 deaths
20th-century French physicists
French Jews who died in the Holocaust
French people who died in Auschwitz concentration camp
Presidents of the Société Française de Physique